The 1957 Michigan Wolverines football team represented the University of Michigan in the 1957 Big Ten Conference football season. In its 10th year under head coach Bennie Oosterbaan, Michigan compiled a 5–3–1 record (3–3–1 against conference opponents), finished in sixth place in the Big Ten, and outscored opponents by a combined total of 187 to 147.

Left tackle Jim Orwig was the team captain. Left halfback Jim Pace received the team's most valuable player award, won the Chicago Tribune Silver Football as the most valuable player in the Big Ten, and was selected as a first-team All-American and All-Big Ten player.

The team's statistical leaders included quarterback Jim Van Pelt with 629 passing yards, Jim Pace with 664 rushing yards, and left end Gary Prahst with 233 receiving yards.

Schedule

Statistical leaders
Michigan's individual statistical leaders for the 1957 season include those listed below.

Rushing

Passing

Receiving

Kickoff returns

Punt returns

Players
The starting lineup of the 1957 football team was made up of the following players. Players who started at least four games are shown with their names in bold.
Robert Boshoven - started 1 game at right end
Dave Bowers - started 1 game at left end
James Byers- started 4 games at fullback
Alex Callahan - started 1 game at left guard
James Davies - started 9 games at right tackle
Larry Faul - started 8 games at left guard
Jerry Goebel - started 5 games at center
John Herrnstein - started 4 games at fullback
Dick Heynen - started 1 game at left tackle
Walter Johnson - started 8 games at right end
Jerry Marciniak - started 1 game at right guard
Brad Myers - started 3 games at right halfback
Stan Noskin - started 2 games at quarterback
Marv Nyren - started 8 games at right guard
Jim Orwig - started 8 games at left tackle
Jim Pace - started 9 games at left halfback
Gary Prahst - started 8 games at left end
Mike Shatusky - started 6 games at right halfback
Gene Snider - started 4 games at center
Jim Van Pelt - started 7 games at quarterback (7)

Other players on the team included the following:
Willie Smith - tackle

Awards and honors
Honors and awards for the 1957 season went to the following individuals.
Captain: Jim Orwig
All-Americans: Jim Pace
All-Big Ten: Jim Pace
Most Valuable Player: Jim Pace
Meyer Morton Award: Charles Teusher
John Maulbetsch Award: George Genyk

Coaching staff
Michigan's 1957 coaching, training, and support staff included the following persons.
Head coach: Bennie Oosterbaan
Assistant coaches: Jack Blott, Don Dufek, Bump Elliott, Robert Hollway, Cliff Keen, Matt Patanelli, Walter Weber
Trainer: Jim Hunt
Manager: Lynn Evans

References

Michigan
Michigan Wolverines football seasons
Michigan Wolverines football